Dmitry Petrovich Buturlin (11 May 1790 – 21 October 1849) was a Russian Empire general and military historian from an old noble family of Ratshid stock. He was admitted into the Governing Senate in May 1833 and into the State Council of Imperial Russia in December 1840.

Biography
He took part in many campaigns of the Napoleonic Wars as aide-de-camp to Prince Pyotr Mikhailovich Volkonsky and Alexander I of Russia. In 1823 he went to France to help suppress the Spanish Revolution of 1820 and distinguished himself in the Battle of Trocadero. He retired after the Russo-Turkish War (1828–1829) with the rank of Major General, but was recalled to active service on the occasion of the Hungarian Revolt of 1848.

After giving up his military career, Buturlin was appointed Director of the Imperial Public Library in 1843. Buturlin's obscurantist views led him to demand from Czar Nicholas I of Russia an all-pervasive system of censorship. The Committee was disbanded early in the reign of Alexander II of Russia.

As a historian Buturlin described in detail the major wars of Catherine II's reign and the Patriotic War of 1812. Many of his works are in French. He viewed Alexander I as the true saviour of Russia and ranked the Battle of Borodino among Kutuzov's mistakes.

References 
 Военный Энциклопедический Словарь [The Military Encyclopaedic Dictionary]. Article "Buturlin, Dmitry Petrovich". Moscow, 1986. 
 Buturlin's biography on the Russian National Library website.

1790 births
1849 deaths
Imperial Russian Army generals
Russian untitled nobility
Historians from the Russian Empire
Russian military historians
Members of the State Council (Russian Empire)
Writers from Saint Petersburg
Burials at the Dukhovskaya Church
Military personnel from Saint Petersburg